The 2020 United States presidential election in Massachusetts was held on Tuesday, November 3, 2020, as part of the 2020 United States presidential election in which all 50 states plus the District of Columbia participated. Massachusetts voters chose electors to represent them in the Electoral College via a popular vote, pitting the Republican Party's nominee, incumbent President Donald Trump, and running mate Vice President Mike Pence against Democratic Party nominee, former Vice President Joe Biden, and his running mate California Senator Kamala Harris. Massachusetts has 11 electoral votes in the Electoral College.

Biden easily carried Massachusetts with a 33-point margin, the largest margin whereby any nominee had carried the state since Lyndon B. Johnson's 1964 landslide. Massachusetts was one of three states where Biden won every county, the other two being Rhode Island and Hawaii.

Massachusetts voted 29% more Democratic than the national average.

Primary elections
Presidential preference primaries were scheduled for March 3, 2020, for each of the political parties with state ballot access.

Democratic primary

Bernie Sanders and Joe Biden were among the declared major Democratic candidates. Elizabeth Warren, one of the two current senators from Massachusetts, formed an exploratory committee in December 2018 and declared her intention to run in February 2019.

Republican primary
Massachusetts governor Charlie Baker declined to run, as did former Massachusetts governor and Utah senator Mitt Romney.

Libertarian primary

A number of Libertarian candidates declared for the race, including New Hampshire State Representative Max Abramson, Adam Kokesh, Vermin Supreme and former Libertarian National Committee vice-chair Arvin Vohra.

Green primary

General election

Predictions

Polling

Graphical summary

Aggregate polls

Polls

with Donald Trump and Bernie Sanders

with Donald Trump and Elizabeth Warren

Results

By county

By congressional district 
Biden won all nine congressional districts, breaking 60% of the vote in eight of them.

Analysis 
Massachusetts has been a Democratic-leaning state since 1928, and a Democratic stronghold since 1960, and has maintained extremely large Democratic margins since 1996. This remained true in 2020, with Massachusetts being one of six states (along with Hawaii, Vermont, Maryland, California, and New York) to give Biden over 60% of the vote. Massachusetts is ethnically diverse, highly urbanized, highly educated, and among the least religious states. Per exit polls by the Associated Press, Biden's strength in Massachusetts came from college-educated voters, which he won with 74% of the vote, which carries particular weight in Massachusetts, as the state contains the highest proportion of graduates in the country. Trump's slip among suburban white voters led Biden to carry almost every municipality in the Greater Boston area by at least 60% or more, while Trump carried only several towns on the South Shore and in Central Massachusetts. Biden won 301 of the 351 municipalities. Biden swept all demographic groups, garnering 63% of whites, 84% of Latinos, 58% of Catholics, 56% of Protestants, and 86% of Jewish voters. Additionally, Biden won 52% of whites without a college degree within the state, one of Trump's strongest demographics elsewhere in the country. While Biden overwhelmingly carried Latino voters in the state, Trump improved on his 2016 performance in heavily Hispanic cities such as Lawrence, Chelsea, and Holyoke. Trump had the worst vote share in Massachusetts of any Republican nominee since Bob Dole in 1996, and slightly underperformed George W. Bush's 32.5% vote share in 2000.

Massachusetts was one of five states in the nation in which Biden's victory margin was larger than 1 million raw votes, the others being California, Maryland, New York and Illinois.

See also
 2020 Massachusetts general election
 United States presidential elections in Massachusetts
 2020 United States elections
 2020 Democratic Party presidential primaries
 2020 Republican Party presidential primaries
 2020 Libertarian Party presidential primaries
 2020 Green Party presidential primaries
 2020 United States elections

Notes

References

Further reading
 
 . (About incident in Dalton, Massachusetts)

External links
 
 
  (state affiliate of the U.S. League of Women Voters)
 

Massachusetts
2020
Presidential